Sampson Hale Butler (January 3, 1803 – March 16, 1848) was a U.S. Representative from South Carolina.

Born near Ninety Six, Edgefield District, South Carolina, Butler attended the country schools and South Carolina College (now the University of South Carolina) at Columbia.  He studied law.  He was admitted to the bar in 1825 and commenced practice in Edgefield, South Carolina.

He moved to Barnwell, South Carolina, and continued the practice of law.  Sheriff of Barnwell County 1832–1839, he then served as member of the State house of representatives from 1832–1835.

Butler was elected as a Democrat to the Twenty-sixth and Twenty-seventh Congresses and served from March 4, 1839, until September 27, 1842, when he resigned.

He resumed the practice of law.  He moved to Florida and died in Tallahassee, Florida, March 16, 1848.  He was interred in a cemetery in that city.

Sources

1803 births
1848 deaths
People from Barnwell, South Carolina
Democratic Party members of the South Carolina House of Representatives
Democratic Party members of the United States House of Representatives from South Carolina
19th-century American politicians
People from Edgefield County, South Carolina